Henry Manners, 2nd Earl of Rutland, 13th Baron de Ros of Helmsley, KG (23 September 152617 September 1563) was an English nobleman.

Origins
He was the son and heir of Thomas Manners, 1st Earl of Rutland and his wife Eleanor Paston.

Career
Like his father, Earl Henry held many offices. As Warden of the Scottish Marches he reprieved the town of Haddington in June 1549, and recaptured Ferniehirst Castle. Whilst anxious to return home on account of his mother's ill health in November 1549, he was required to investigate the activities of Thomas Wyndham a sailor who had captured merchant vessels in the Forth. In December 1549, his mother-in-law, the Dowager of Westmorland, complained to him that he had established a garrison of Italian soldiers at Bywell, one her villages. He was made admiral in 1556, and the following year was Captain-general of the cavalry at the siege of St Quentin under Mary I of England. Under Elizabeth I he served successfully and she made him Lord Lieutenant of Nottinghamshire and Rutland, Knight of the Garter and President of the North. Not long before his premature death, he completed the building of Belvoir Castle.

After the untimely death of Edward VI in 1553, and the subsequent death of Edward Courtenay 1st Earl of Devon in 1556, Rutland stood as Heir presumptive as the senior male descendant of Richard 3rd Duke of York. James VI/I, the son of Mary Queen of Scots would not be born until 1566. His descent can be traced through Anne of York, Duchess of Exeter.

Marriage and progeny

He married twice:
Firstly on 3 July 1536  to Margaret Neville (died 1559), daughter of Ralph Neville, 4th Earl of Westmorland by whom he had three children: 
Edward Manners, 3rd Earl of Rutland
John Manners, 4th Earl of Rutland
Elizabeth Manners (c. 1553c. 1590), who married Sir William V Courtenay (1553–1630), de jure 3rd Earl of Devon, of Powderham Castle, Devon.
Secondly after Margaret's death, he married Bridget, the widow of Richard Morrison. Her third husband was Francis Russell, 2nd Earl of Bedford.

Death and burial
He is buried at St Mary the Virgin's Church, Bottesford in Leicestershire.

Monument

His tomb, in the centre of the chancel next to that of his father, is of alabaster and considered unique. The effigies lie beneath a decorated example of an Elizabethan dining table on heavy carved legs, suggesting an attempt to represent a communion table. Earl Henry is depicted in armour of conventional pattern except that the breastplate is made up of laminated plates. He wears a coronet and his head is supported on a tilt-heaume. He is wearing a chain nearly reaching his thighs, and the Order of the Garter is on the left leg. He holds a closed book in his right hand and a sword in his left. At his feet is a hornless unicorn. His wife, Margaret, also wears a coronet and is dressed in the style of the time, with an ermine-trimmed mantle.  Her head rests on a scroll and her feet on a lion.

Notes

References

 Historical Manuscripts Commission, 12th Report, Appendix part 4, Manuscripts of the Duke of Rutland at Belvoir Castle, vol. 1(1888)
 familysearch.org Accessed 2 June 2007
 stirnet.com Accessed 2 June 2007

|-

1526 births
1563 deaths
02
13
Knights of the Garter
Lord-Lieutenants of Nottinghamshire
Lord-Lieutenants of Rutland
Lord-Lieutenants of Lincolnshire
English people of the Rough Wooing
H
16th-century English nobility